Levente Jova (born 30 January 1992) is a Hungarian football player. He plays for Vasas SC in the Hungarian NB I.
He played his first league match in 2011.

Club statistics

Updated to games played as of 6 July 2017.

Honours
Ferencváros
Hungarian League Cup (1): 2012–13

References

External links
FTC Official Site Profile

1992 births
Living people
People from Orosháza
Hungarian footballers
Hungary youth international footballers
Hungary under-21 international footballers
Association football goalkeepers
Békéscsaba 1912 Előre footballers
MTK Budapest FC players
Ferencvárosi TC footballers
Soroksári TE footballers
Nyíregyháza Spartacus FC players
Vasas SC players
Nemzeti Bajnokság I players
Nemzeti Bajnokság II players
Sportspeople from Békés County
21st-century Hungarian people